Claude Weaver (March 19, 1867 – May 19, 1954) was an American politician, judge, and U.S. Representative from Oklahoma.

Biography
Born in Gainesville, Texas, Weaver was the son of W. T. G. and Nancy Wilkin Fletcher Weaver, and attended the public schools. He graduated from the law department of the University of Texas at Austin in 1887 and was admitted to the bar the same year. He married Leila Ada Reinhardt, and they had five children: Floy, Amelia, Barbara, Lucy, and Claude, Jr.

Career
Weaver practiced in Gainesville, Texas, from 1887 to 1895, serving as assistant prosecuting attorney of Cooke County, Texas, in 1892. He moved to Pauls Valley, Indian Territory, in 1895 and resumed the practice of law. In 1910, he moved to Oklahoma City, Oklahoma, once again resuming his practice. There he served as member of Oklahoma City Board of Freeholders in 1910.

Elected as a Democrat to the Sixty-third Congress, Weaver served from March 4, 1913, to March 3, 1915. He was an unsuccessful candidate for renomination in 1914 and for election to fill a vacancy in the Sixty-sixth Congress in 1919. He became Postmaster of Oklahoma City, Oklahoma from 1915 to 1923.

Weaver served as acting county attorney of Oklahoma County in 1926. He was legal adviser and secretary to the Governor, William H. Murray from 1931 to 1934, and district judge of thirteenth Oklahoma district in 1934 and 1935.

Death
Weaver died in Oklahoma City, Oklahoma, on May 19, 1954, at the age of 87 years, 62 days. He is interred at Fairlawn Cemetery in Oklahoma City.

References

External links
 

Claude Weaver Collection and Photograph Series at the Carl Albert Center

1867 births
1954 deaths
Oklahoma state court judges
People from Gainesville, Texas
Politicians from Oklahoma City
Democratic Party members of the United States House of Representatives from Oklahoma